Nationality words link to articles with information on the nation's poetry or literature (for instance, Irish or France).

Events

Works published

Births
Death years link to the corresponding "[year] in poetry" article. There are conflicting or unreliable sources for the birth years of many people born in this period; where sources conflict, the poet is listed again and the conflict is noted:

1100:
 Rabbeinu Tam (died 1171), Hebrew rabbi and liturgical poet, in France
 Geoffrey of Monmouth (died 1155), Welsh cleric whose Latin writings include early versions of the Merlin (King Arthur) epic

1103:
 Yue Fei (died 1142), Chinese Song dynasty poet

1105:
 Basava (died 1167), Indian Kannada language Vachana sahitya poet

1106:
 Khwaja Ahmad Yasavi (died 1166), Turkish poet
 Minamoto no Yorimasa (died 1180), Japanese poet

1107:
 June 12 - Emperor Gaozong of Song (died 1187) Chinese poet
 Falaki Shirvani (died 1157), Persian poet

Deaths
Birth years link to the corresponding "[year] in poetry" article:

1101:
 Su Shi (born 1037), Song Dynasty writer, poet, artist, calligrapher, pharmacologist, and statesman

See also

 Poetry
 12th century in poetry
 12th century in literature
 List of years in poetry

Other events:
 Other events of the 12th century
 Other events of the 13th century

12th century:
 12th century in poetry
 12th century in literature

Notes

12th-century poetry
Poetry